List of Being Human characters may refer to:

 List of Being Human (British TV series) characters
 List of Being Human (North American TV series) characters